The 20 mm AA Machine Cannon M/38 was a 20 mm  rapid fire autocannon produced by the Danish company Dansk Industri Syndikat (DISA). The gun, which could be adapted to several tactical uses, was a primary weapon of the military of Denmark. It was also exported to numerous countries around the world because of its versatility. The cannon was built at the DISA works in Herlev near Copenhagen. The company supplied several different types of mountings with the weapon which allowed it to be employed in a variety roles such as aerial defences, anti-tank warfare or on naval ships.

Design
The 20 mm Madsen Cannon was originally built by Colonel V. H. O. Madsen of the Royal Danish Army. A version with a necked-out 23 mm round was also produced for the cannon known as the 23 mm Madsen.

Combat
Several 20 mm machine cannons of the Danish Army were responsible for knocking out eleven armoured cars and two Panzer I's during the German invasion on April 9, 1940.

A special variant, the Madsen F5 was designed as an anti-tank gun. It proved very effective against the Japanese tanks until the end of the Second Sino-Japanese War. It was a fully automatic weapon, with two small wheels and a 15-round magazine. At 100 m, it was able to pierce 42 mm of armor, and 32 mm at 500 m. This model was reversed engineered by the Chinese 21st arsenal of Nanjing but only five were produced in 1944.

Mounts

Types
The four standard mountings produced by DISA, although they also used a number of locally designed mounts, were:
 Light Field Mount - Primary anti tank mount, could be folded up and stowed on a motorcycle sidecar
 Universal Mount - Dual purpose mount, fitted with wheels it could be towed by its crew.
 Mobile Anti-Aircraft Mount - Dedicated AA mount.
 Tri-axial Mount - Light weight mount intended for fortifications and naval use.

Self-propelled
 Landsverk L-60 - Light tanks made in Sweden by AB Landsverk and employed by:
  - 2
 Landsverk Lynx - Armored cars made in Sweden by AB Landsverk and employed by:
  - 3
 Landsverk L-180 - Armored Cars made in Sweden by AB Landsverk and employed by:
  - 2 (Madsen 20mm M 1933)
  - 8

Users

 
 
 
 
 
 
 
 
 
 
 
  (evaluation only)
 
 
 
 
 
 
 
  (evaluation only)

References

External links

 Kurze Beschreibung der Munition Fur Die 20mm Madsen Kanone Gegen Luftziele und Tanks (The title, in English, is "Short Description of the Ammunition for the 20mm Madsen Cannon Against Airborne Targets and Tanks.")
 Pictures of the 20 mm machine cannon in different mountings

Weapons of Denmark
World War II anti-aircraft guns
20 mm artillery
Military equipment introduced in the 1930s